Fossemvatnet is a lake in the municipality of Steinkjer in Trøndelag county, Norway.  

The  lake lies just southwest of the large lake Snåsavatnet which flows into Fossemvatnet on its way to the Trondheimsfjord.  The village of Sunnan lies on the northern shore of the lake.

See also
List of lakes in Norway

References

Steinkjer
Lakes of Trøndelag